Cysteine-rich secretory protein LCCL domain-containing 2 is a cysteine-rich secretory protein that in humans is encoded by the CRISPLD2 gene.

It has been predicted or experimentally observed to interact with C1orf173.

References

External links

Further reading

Extracellular matrix proteins